From Dusk till Dawn: The Series is an American action horror television series developed by Robert Rodriguez, using characters and story elements from the 1996 film of the same name written by Quentin Tarantino and Robert Kurtzman, which Rodriguez directed. The series premiered on Rodriguez's El Rey Network on March 11, 2014. Outside the United States and Latin America, the series is marketed as a Netflix original.

D.J. Cotrona stars as Seth Gecko, a hardened bank robber who has just been broken out of prison by his mentally unstable brother Richie (Zane Holtz), who has recently begun having visions of a mysterious woman who urges him to kill and invites him to find her.  Meanwhile, after the death of his wife, former pastor Jacob Fuller (Robert Patrick) is taking an RV vacation into Mexico with his daughter Kate (Madison Davenport) and adopted son Scott (Brandon Soo Hoo). The lives of the Geckos and the Fullers become entwined as the brothers attempt to outrun the authorities and cross the Texas border into Mexico, where they will be sheltered by Cartel boss Don Carlos (Wilmer Valderrama). They are pursued by Texas Ranger Freddie Gonzalez (Jesse Garcia), who is out to avenge the death of his partner and mentor Earl McGraw (Don Johnson), whom the Geckos killed in a botched hostage situation.

Series overview

Episodes

Season 1 (2014)

Season 2 (2015)

Season 3 (2016)

Special 
A companion special, titled On Set: Making of From Dusk till Dawn: The Series, aired on the El Rey network in February 2014. It featured behind-the-scenes exclusive interviews with the cast, crew and writers.

Home releases

References

External links

Episodes
Lists of American crime television series episodes
Lists of horror television series episodes